Hutchins is a city in Dallas County, Texas, United States. Its population was 5,338 at the 2010 census.

History
The area was first inhabited by families around 1860 as a trading place for immigrants who settled along the west bank of the Trinity River and new arrivals who crossed the Trinity at Dowd's Ferry from the east.

The town received its name from railroad developer William J. Hutchins, who was then president and general manager of the Houston and Texas Central Railroad (H&TC). The railway was completed through Hutchins in 1872. That same year a post office opened in the community. The population of Hutchins grew to around 250 residents in 1884 and topped 300 by 1890. That figure declined slightly to 204 in 1904, but had risen to 500 in 1926.

Hutchins was officially incorporated in 1945. In the first census conducted after incorporation in 1950, the population stood at 743. Despite the rapid growth of Dallas County and most of its suburban communities during the latter half of the 20th century, Hutchins has grown at a much slower pace and today is one of the smallest municipalities in the county. As of 2000, the city of Hutchins had 133 businesses and a population of 2,805. Many of the businesses in the city are industrial or manufacturing related. A number of its residents are employed in the city of Dallas.

Geography
It is bordered by Dallas on the north and northwest, Lancaster on the southwest, Wilmer to the south, and the Trinity River to the east. Interstate Highways 20 and 45 pass through the city.

Thomas Korosec of the Dallas Observer wrote that the main street of Hutchins had "a faded, smalltown feel" due to the shops along it.

Demographics

As of the 2020 United States census, 5,607 people, 970 households, and 654 families were residing in the city.

Government and infrastructure
The Texas Department of Criminal Justice operates the Hutchins State Jail for men in Hutchins.

Education

Primary and secondary schools 

Hutchins is served by the Dallas Independent School District (DISD). The area is within the Board of Trustees District 5.

As of fall 2011, the area is zoned to Wilmer-Hutchins Elementary School, Kennedy-Curry Middle School, and Wilmer-Hutchins High School.

School histories

Most of Hutchins was served by the Wilmer-Hutchins Independent School District.

Until the end of the school district, C.S. Winn Elementary School was located in Hutchins. The Hutchins Academic Elementary School was also located in Hutchins. In 2004 the WHISD board voted to close Hutchins Academic, which had 82 students at the time of closure. the former students moved to C.S. Winn and Wilmer Elementary School in Wilmer in January 2005. In addition the Hutchins 5th Grade Center opened in 2000. In addition, Kennedy-Curry Middle School and Wilmer-Hutchins High School in Dallas, then under WHISD control, served Wilmer.

The DISD took over all of WHISD for the 2005–2006 school year. WHISD closed shortly afterwards, with official termination in spring 2006. After the closure of WHISD, property values in the district increased.

For the 2005–2006 school year until the 2010–2011 school year, the WHISD portion of Hutchins was served by several schools located in Dallas. In 2005–2006 and 2006–2007 they included J.P. Starks, Martin Weiss, and Whitney Young. From 2007–2008 to 2010-2011, the elementary schools serving Hutchins only included Martin Weiss and Whitney Young Elementary Schools (in two separate attendance zones).

From 2005 to 2006, until 2010-2011 secondary schools included Hulcy (Weiss zone) and Zumwalt Middle Schools (Starks and Young zones), and Carter High School (Weiss zone) and A. Maceo Smith High School (Starks and Young zones).

The Dallas ISD considered opening a new Wilmer-Hutchins Elementary School building, restoring the Wilmer-Hutchins High School building, and demolishing the Kennedy-Curry Middle School building as part of its 2008 bond campaign. The Wilmer Hutchins Elementary School will open in an area of the City of Dallas in 2011. In November 2010 DISD announced that three schools (Wilmer Hutchins ES, Kennedy-Curry Middle School, and Wilmer-Hutchins HS) would open/reopen in the Wilmer-Hutchins area in 2011.

Public libraries 

The Atwell Public Library serves Hutchins.

Colleges and universities 

Dallas County residents are zoned to Dallas College (formerly Dallas County Community College or DCCC).

Miscellaneous
Union Pacific's Dallas Intermodal Terminal is located partly in the city of Hutchins and partly in the city of Wilmer .

References

External links
 City of Hutchins official website
 Hutchins Fire Department
 Hutchins Police Department
 Hutchins Economic Development Corporation
 Hutchins Economic Development Corporation (Archive)
 

Dallas–Fort Worth metroplex
Cities in Texas
Cities in Dallas County, Texas
Populated places established in 1872
1872 establishments in Texas